Lucas Jonathon Carlisle (born 1 June 1988) is an English cricketer. Carlisle is a left-handed batsman who bowls right-arm off break. He was born in Nottingham, Nottinghamshire and was educated at Worksop College.

While studying for his degree at Durham University, Carilse made his first-class debut for Durham UCCE against Derbyshire in 2008. He made a further first-class appearances for the university in 2008, against Durham. In his two first-class matches, he scored 28 runs at an average of 14.00, with a high score of 18 not out.

Now working for Sport England as Head of Business Transformation, Carlisle remains a keen cricketer. He had a particular successful August Bank Holiday 2019, helping Acton CC to beat Wembley CC on Saturday 24 August, watching Ben Stokes carry England in the 2019 Ashes on Sunday 25th, and leading Acton CC to a win in the final of the West London Whack against Chiswick CC on Monday 26th, with a match-winning batting innings of 77: a step up from his Durham days.

References

External links
Lucas Carlisle at ESPNcricinfo
Lucas Carlisle at CricketArchive

1988 births
Living people
Cricketers from Nottingham
People educated at Worksop College
Alumni of Durham University
English cricketers
Durham MCCU cricketers